Brothers is a 2004 Danish psychological thriller war film directed by Susanne Bier and written by Bier and Anders Thomas Jensen. It stars Nikolaj Lie Kaas, Connie Nielsen and Ulrich Thomsen.

The film was remade as an American production with the same title (2009), directed by Jim Sheridan.

Plot 
A Danish army officer, Michael (Thomsen), is sent to the International Security Assistance Force operation in Afghanistan for three months. His first mission there is to find a young radar technician who had been separated from his squad some days earlier. While on the search, his helicopter is shot down and he is taken as a prisoner of war, but is assumed to have been killed in action and is reported dead to his family. His wife Sarah (Nielsen) and younger brother Jannik (Kaas) both deeply mourn him, and that brings them closer together. They kiss once, but pass it off as grief and do not pursue the relationship.

Meanwhile, both the officer and a young technician are locked up in a warehouse, kept without food or water. After Michael shows them how to arm and disarm an anti-aircraft missile, his captors decide the technician is no longer useful and have Michael bludgeon him to death with a lead pipe in order to save his own life. Eventually he is rescued and brought back to Denmark. The guilt of what he did forces him to lie and provide false hope that the technician may still be alive.

Michael becomes unstable, spiraling down into a pit of guilt and rage, and begins to threaten and abuse his wife and tear the house apart. It finally becomes necessary for the police to intervene. Michael overreacts, pointing a policeman's pistol at the officers. After Michael is taken into custody, Jannik helps Sarah begin the repairs on the house. Later, Sarah visits Michael in prison, where he breaks down and finally admits the truth about what he did in Afghanistan.

Cast 
 Connie Nielsen as Sarah
 Ulrich Thomsen as Michael
 Nikolaj Lie Kaas as Jannik
 Sarah Juel Werner as Natalia (daughter)
 Rebecca Løgstrup as Camilla (daughter)
 Bent Mejding as Henning
 Solbjørg Højfeldt as Else
 Niels Olsen as Allentoft
  as Niels Peter
 Lars Hjortshøj as Preben 2
 Lars Ranthe as Preben 1
 André Babikian as Slobodan
  as J. Solvej
  as Ditte
 Henrik Koefoed as Bartender
 Tom Mannion as Captain David Ward

Production 
The film was produced by Zentropa in co-production with companies in the United Kingdom, Sweden and Norway. It received support from the Danish Film Institute, Swedish Film Institute and Nordisk Film- & TV-Fond (Nordic Film and TV Foundation). It was primarily shot on location in Copenhagen, Denmark; Almería, Spain, was used for the Afghanistan locales.

Reception

Opera adaptation 
An opera entitled Brothers, based on the story of the film, was composed by Icelandic composer Daníel Bjarnason. It was premiered at the Musikhuset Aarhus in Denmark on 16 August 2017. It was commissioned by Den Jyske Opera. To celebrate Aarhus as the European Capital of Culture 2017, three stage works – a musical, dance, and an opera all based on films by Susanne Bier – were commissioned and performed in Musikhuset.

References

External links 
 
 
 

2004 films
2000s Danish-language films
2000s English-language films
Pashto-language films
2004 drama films
Danish drama films
Films directed by Susanne Bier
Films with screenplays by Anders Thomas Jensen
Films set in Afghanistan
Films set in Denmark
Films shot in Denmark
Films shot in Almería
War in Afghanistan (2001–2021) films
Nordisk Film films
Zentropa films
Films about brothers
Films adapted into operas
2004 multilingual films
Danish multilingual films